Qanavat Rural District is a rural district (dehestan) in the Central District of Qom County, Qom Province, Iran. At the 2006 census, its population was 16,658, in 3,657 families.  The rural district has 18 villages. The seat of the rural district is Jamkaran.

References 

Rural Districts of Qom Province
Qom County